Advista AS  is a Norwegian company offering search services and directory assistance 180.no (Norway) in 13 European countries. The company was founded in 2003 by Stian Gundersen, Øyvind Bangsund and Benjamin Fauchald. Advistas products are based on technology provided by Google.

Advista means a "view of advertisement".

External links
Advista Norway - Official website
Nettkatalogen.no Norway - Norway's third largest online directory
180.no Nummeropplysning Norway - White pages
Gulex.se Sweden - Business directory and search engine Sweden 
Gulex.dk Denmark - Business directory and search engine Denmark
Gelbex.de Germany - Business directory and search engine Germany

Telecommunications companies of Norway
Norwegian companies established in 2003